Wallace Clayton "Wah Wah" Jones (July 14, 1926 – July 27, 2014) was an American professional basketball player. He played in the National Basketball Association (NBA) from 1949 to 1952 with the Indianapolis Olympians.

Biography
Jones was born in Harlan, Kentucky. He attended Harlan High School, where he set a national scoring record in basketball and led his school to a state championship.   He was all-state in football, basketball and baseball.

Jones attended the University of Kentucky, where he continued to play varsity football, basketball and baseball. He was twice All-SEC in football.  In basketball, he was a three time All-American and four time All-SEC.  He led the Wildcats to two NCAA Championships, in 1948 and 1949.  Jones was a member of the 1948 Olympic Gold medal winning team with Adolph Rupp's "Fabulous Five" and the Phillips 66ers. During his four years at Kentucky, the basketball team had a combined record of 130-10 and won the SEC championship every year.

He holds the unique distinction of being an All-American under both legends, Adolph Rupp (basketball) and Bear Bryant (football) when both coached at Kentucky. He is the only player to have his number retired in both football and basketball at Kentucky. At the University of Kentucky, Jones was a member of the Phi Delta Theta fraternity. Jones was selected in the seventh round of the 1949 NFL Draft by the Chicago Bears, but did not play in the league.

In 1953, Jones was elected the sheriff of Fayette County, Kentucky.  In 1956, Jones was the Republican nominee for Kentucky's 6th congressional district seat in the United States House of Representatives.  Though Dwight Eisenhower, heading the Republican ticket, carried the state, Jones lost the election to Democrat John C. Watts.

In 1978, Jones started a charter bus company called "Blue Grass Tours" that was contracted to the UK Athletics department and more recently purchased a custom sleeper coach for the use of the athletic teams.

"Wah Wah"
Known as Wallace in his early years, Jones acquired the nickname, "Wah Wah", when his younger sister Jackie, just learning to talk, could not pronounce his name.

Death
Jones died in Lexington on July 27, 2014 at the age of 88.

Career statistics

NBA
Source

Regular season

Playoffs

References

External links
 Stats

1926 births
2014 deaths
All-American college men's basketball players
American men's basketball players
Basketball coaches from Kentucky
Basketball players at the 1948 Summer Olympics
Basketball players from Kentucky
Indianapolis Olympians coaches
Indianapolis Olympians players
Kentucky Republicans
Kentucky Wildcats football players
Kentucky Wildcats men's basketball players
Kentucky Wildcats baseball players
Medalists at the 1948 Summer Olympics
Olympic gold medalists for the United States in basketball
People from Harlan, Kentucky
Power forwards (basketball)
United States men's national basketball team players
Washington Capitols draft picks